Giuseppe Saragat (19 September 1898 – 11 June 1988) was an Italian politician who served as the president of Italy from 1964 to 1971.

Early life
Saragat was born on 19 September 1898 in Turin, Piedmont, Kingdom of Italy, to Sardinian parents. He was a member of the Unitary Socialist Party (Partito Socialista Unitario; PSU) from 1922. He moved to Vienna in 1926 and to France in 1929.

Political career
Following the dissolution of the PSU in 1930, Saragat joined the Italian Socialist Party (Partito Socialista Italiano, PSI). A reformist, he was a democratic socialist who left the PSI in 1947 out of concern over its then-close alliance with the Italian Communist Party. He subsequently founded the Socialist Party of Italian Workers (Partito Socialista dei Lavoratori Italiani, PSLI), which in 1952 became the Italian Democratic Socialist Party (Partito Socialista Democratico Italiano; PSDI). He was to be the paramount leader of the PSDI for the rest of his life.

In 1944, Saragat had been a minister without portfolio and ambassador in Paris from 1945 to 1946, before his appointment as president of the Constituent Assembly of Italy that same year upon the establishment of the Italian Republic. He was minister of foreign affairs in the Moro I Cabinet and Moro II Cabinet, headed by Christian Democracy leader Aldo Moro from 1963 to late 1964, when he was chosen as President of the Italian Republic. His election demonstrated a rare instance of unity among the Italian left and followed rumours of a possible neo-fascist coup, Piano Solo, during Antonio Segni's presidency.

Saragat died in Rome, Lazio, on 11 June 1988. An atheist, he is said to have become a Catholic and had a religious funeral.

Notes

References

External links
 
 

1898 births
1988 deaths
Politicians from Turin
Italian resistance movement members
Italian Socialist Party politicians
Presidents of Italy
Deputy Prime Ministers of Italy
Foreign ministers of Italy
Italian life senators
Italian anti-fascists
Italian Democratic Socialist Party politicians
20th-century Italian politicians
University of Turin alumni
Politicians of Sardinia
Italian prisoners and detainees
Italian expatriates in France
Italian expatriates in Austria
Members of the Executive of the Labour and Socialist International
Ambassadors of Italy to France
Unitary Socialist Party (Italy, 1922) politicians
Exiled Italian politicians